Shandong Television (SDTV) is a television network covering the Jinan city and Shandong province area. It was founded and started to broadcast on October 1, 1960. SDTV currently broadcasts in Chinese.

External links
 Official Website 
 Official Video Website 

1960 establishments in China
Television networks in China
Government-owned companies of China
Mass media in Shandong
Organizations based in Jinan
Television channels and stations established in 1960
Mass media in Jinan